Phetmuangchon Por.Suantong (เพชรเมืองชล ภ.สวนทอง) is a Thai Muay Thai fighter.

Career 

Phetmuangchon retired in 2018 to become a Muay Thai instructor at Evolve MMA in Singapore.
Phetmuangchon made his comeback to Muay Thai on Petchyindee's Muaymumwansuk show at Rangsit Stadium on December 18, 2020. He won by decision against Pirapat Muayded789.

Titles and accomplishments

 S1 105 lbs Champion
 2013 Rajadamnern Stadium 105 lbs Champion
 2014 Rajadamnern Stadium 108 lbs Champion
 2015 Omnoi Stadium 112 lbs Champion
 2017 Sports Authority of Thailand Fighter of the Year

Fight record

|-  style="background:#fbb;"
| 2021-04-04|| Loss||align=left| Ngaopayak OrBorTor.Nonthong || MuayDee VitheeThai, Blue Arena || Samut Prakan, Thailand || Decision || 5 || 3:00
|-  style="background:#cfc;"
| 2020-12-18|| Win ||align=left| Pirapat Muayded789 || True4u Muaymumwansuk, Rangsit Stadium || Rangsit, Thailand || Decision || 5 || 3:00
|-  style="background:#fbb;"
| 2018-05-09|| Loss||align=left| Rungnarai Kiatmuu9 || Rajadamnern Stadium || Bangkok, Thailand || Decision || 5 || 3:00
|-  style="background:#cfc;"
| 2018-03-07|| Win ||align=left| Sam-D Petchyindee Academy || Rajadamnern Stadium || Bangkok, Thailand || Decision || 5 || 3:00
|-  style="background:#fbb;"
| 2018-01-31|| Loss||align=left| Palangpon PetchyindeeAcademy || Rajadamnern Stadium || Bangkok, Thailand || Decision || 5 || 3:00
|-  style="background:#c5d2ea;"
| 2018-01-07|| Draw||align=left| Priewpak Sor.Jor.Vichitpaedriw || Blue Arena || Samut Prakan, Thailand || Decision || 5 || 3:00 
|-
! style=background:white colspan=9 |
|-  style="background:#cfc;"
| 2017-11-16|| Win||align=left| Rungnarai Kiatmuu9 || Rajadamnern Stadium || Bangkok, Thailand || Decision || 5 || 3:00
|-  style="background:#cfc;"
| 2017-09-29|| Win ||align=left| Sam-D Petchyindee Academy || Lumpinee Stadium || Bangkok, Thailand || Decision || 5 || 3:00
|-  style="background:#cfc;"
| 2017-09-06|| Win||align=left| Sarawut Sor.Jor.Vichitpaedriw || Rajadamnern Stadium || Bangkok, Thailand || Decision || 5 || 3:00
|-  style="background:#cfc;"
| 2017-08-03|| Win||align=left| Rungnarai Kiatmuu9 || Rajadamnern Stadium || Bangkok, Thailand || Decision || 5 || 3:00
|-  style="background:#cfc;"
| 2017-06-29|| Win||align=left| Sarawut Sor.Jor.Vichitpaedriw || Rajadamnern Stadium || Bangkok, Thailand || Decision || 5 || 3:00
|-  style="background:#cfc;"
| 2017-06-01|| Win||align=left| Ngao-Payak OrBorTor.Nonthong || Rajadamnern Stadium || Bangkok, Thailand || Decision || 5 || 3:00
|-  style="background:#cfc;"
| 2017-03-25|| Win||align=left| Phetsuphan Por.Daorungruang || Montri Studio || Bangkok, Thailand || KO || 3 ||
|-  style="background:#cfc;"
| 2017-02-19|| Win||align=left| Sueayai Chor.Hapayak || Rangsit Stadium|| Rangsit, Thailand || TKO || 4 ||
|-  style="background:#cfc;"
| 2017-01-09|| Win||align=left| Priewpak Sor.Jor.Vichitpaedriw || Rajadamnern Stadium || Bangkok, Thailand || Decision || 5 || 3:00
|-  style="background:#c5d2ea;"
| 2016-12-21|| Draw||align=left| Priewpak Sor.Jor.Vichitpaedriw || Rajadamnern Stadium || Bangkok, Thailand || Decision || 5 || 3:00
|-  style="background:#fbb;"
| 2016-11-19|| Loss ||align=left| Phetniyom F.A.Group || Montri Studio || Bangkok, Thailand || Decision || 5 || 3:00
|-  style="background:#cfc;"
| 2016-10-22|| Win ||align=left| Hakim Hamech || La Nuit Des Challenges 16 || France || Decision || 3 || 3:00
|-  style="background:#c5d2ea;"
| 2016-10-13|| Draw||align=left| Phetniyom F.A.Group || Rajadamnern Stadium || Bangkok, Thailand || Decision || 5 || 3:00
|-  style="background:#fbb;"
| 2016-09-14|| Loss ||align=left| Gingsanglek Tor.Laksong || Rajadamnern Stadium || Bangkok, Thailand || Decision || 5 || 3:00
|-  style="background:#cfc;"
| 2016-08-04|| Win||align=left| Gingsanglek Tor.Laksong || Rajadamnern Stadium || Bangkok, Thailand || Decision || 5 || 3:00
|-  style="background:#cfc;"
| 2016-06-19|| Win ||align=left| Kaito Wor.Wanchai || Wanchai+Kingthong MuayThai Super Fight ||Nagoya, Japan || Decision || 5 || 3:00
|-  style="background:#cfc;"
| 2016-05-26|| Win||align=left| Kiewpayak Jitmuangnon  || Rajadamnern Stadium ||Bangkok, Thailand || Decision || 5 || 3:00
|-  style="background:#cfc;"
| 2016-04-30|| Win||align=left| Singhaudorn Audaudorn  ||  Omnoi Stadium ||Samut Sakhon, Thailand || Decision || 5 || 3:00
|-  style="background:#cfc;"
| 2016-03-31|| Win||align=left| Phetsuphan Por.Daorungruang || Rajadamnern Stadium ||Bangkok, Thailand || Decision || 5 || 3:00
|-  style="background:#fbb;"
| 2016-03-03|| Loss||align=left|  Puenkon Tor.Surat || Rajadamnern Stadium || Bangkok, Thailand || Decision  || 5 || 3:00
|-  style="background:#fbb;"
| 2016-01-27|| Loss||align=left|  Puenkon Tor.Surat || Rajadamnern Stadium || Bangkok, Thailand || Decision  || 5 || 3:00
|-  style="background:#cfc;"
| 2015-12-02|| Win||align=left| Kwandom Phetsimean || Rajadamnern Stadium ||Bangkok, Thailand || Decision || 5 || 3:00
|-  style="background:#fbb;"
| 2015-10-11|| Loss||align=left|  Suriyanlek Aor.Bor.Tor.Kampee || Rajadamnern Stadium ||Bangkok, Thailand || Decision || 5 || 3:00
|-  style="background:#fbb;"
| 2015-08-13|| Loss||align=left| Phetthanakit JSP || Rajadamnern Stadium ||Bangkok, Thailand || Decision || 5 || 3:00
|-  style="background:#cfc;"
| 2015-07-22|| Win||align=left| Ngaopayak OrBorTor.Nonthong || Rajadamnern Stadium || Bangkok, Thailand || Decision || 5 || 3:00
|-  style="background:#fbb;"
| 2015-05-07|| Loss||align=left| Kwandom Phetsimean || Rajadamnern Stadium ||Bangkok, Thailand || Decision || 5 || 3:00
|-
! style=background:white colspan=9 |
|-  style="background:#cfc;"
| 2015-03-28|| Win||align=left| Han Sor.Sakkarin ||  Omnoi Stadium ||Samut Sakhon, Thailand || Decision || 5 || 3:00
|-
! style=background:white colspan=9 |
|-  style="background:#cfc;"
| 2014-12-31|| Win||align=left| Phetsuphan Por.Daorungruang || Rajadamnern Stadium ||Bangkok, Thailand || Decision || 5 || 3:00
|-  style="background:#fbb;"
| 2014-11-03|| Loss||align=left| Wanpichit Meenayothin || Rajadamnern Stadium ||Bangkok, Thailand || KO || 4 ||
|-  style="background:#fbb;"
| 2014-09-24|| Loss||align=left| Chaimongkol Sujeebahmeekeaw || Rajadamnern Stadium ||Bangkok, Thailand || Decision || 5 || 3:00
|-  style="background:#cfc;"
| 2014-08-14|| Win||align=left| Kumandoi Sor.Jitpakdee || Rajadamnern Stadium ||Bangkok, Thailand || Decision || 5 || 3:00
|-
! style=background:white colspan=9 |
|-  style="background:#fbb;"
| 2014-06-17|| Loss||align=left| Wanpichit Meenayothin || Rajadamnern Stadium ||Bangkok, Thailand || Decision || 5 || 3:00
|-  style="background:#cfc;"
| 2013-12-06|| Win||align=left| Sanchai Tor.Laksong || Suwit Stadium ||Phuket, Thailand || Decision || 5 || 3:00
|-  style="background:#fbb;"
| 2013-10-24|| Loss||align=left| Oley Sitniwat || Rajadamnern Stadium ||Bangkok, Thailand || Decision || 5 || 3:00
|-  style="background:#fbb;"
| 2013-09-11|| Loss||align=left|  Detkart Por Pongsawang || Rajadamnern Stadium ||Bangkok, Thailand || Decision || 5 || 3:00
|-  style="background:#cfc;"
| 2013-08-05|| Win||align=left| Sanchai Tor.Laksong || Rajadamnern Stadium ||Bangkok, Thailand || Decision || 5 || 3:00
|-
! style=background:white colspan=9 |
|-  style="background:#cfc;"
| 2013-06-03|| Win||align=left| Kumandoi Sor.Jitpakdee || Rajadamnern Stadium ||Bangkok, Thailand || Decision || 5 || 3:00
|-  style="background:#fbb;"
| 2013-03-11|| Loss ||align=left| Det Sor Ploenchit|| Rajadamnern Stadium ||Bangkok, Thailand || Decision || 5 || 3:00
|-  style="background:#fbb;"
| 2013-02-07|| Loss ||align=left| Ploysiam PetchyindeeAcademy|| Rajadamnern Stadium ||Bangkok, Thailand || Decision || 5 || 3:00
|-  style="background:#fbb;"
| 2012-12-18|| Loss||align=left| Satanmuanglek CP Freshmart || Lumpinee Stadium || Bangkok, Thailand || KO (Left elbow) ||  ||
|-  style="background:#cfc;"
| 2012-11-12|| Win||align=left| Yodsaenchai Sor.Jor.Toipadriew || Rajadamnern Stadium ||Bangkok, Thailand || KO (Right Elbow)|| 3 ||
|-  style="background:#cfc;"
| 2012-10-19|| Win||align=left| Wanpichit Meenayothin || Rajadamnern Stadium ||Bangkok, Thailand || KO (Left Elbow)|| 2 ||
|-  style="background:#cfc;"
| 2012-07-12|| Win||align=left| Satanmuanglek CP Freshmart || Rajadamnern Stadium || Bangkok, Thailand || Decision || 5 || 3:00
|-  style="background:#cfc;"
| 2011-07-29|| Win||align=left| Maneedang Kiatbanpho || Lumpinee Stadium ||Bangkok, Thailand || KO || 4 ||
|-  style="background:#cfc;"
| 2011-07-08|| Win||align=left| || Bangla Stadium ||Phuket, Thailand || KO (Low Kicks)|| 2 ||
|-  style="background:#fbb;"
| 2011-01-01|| Loss ||align=left| Phetsiam Lookklongtun ||  Omnoi Stadium ||Samut Sakhon, Thailand || Decision || 5 || 3:00
|-
! style=background:white colspan=9 |
|-
| colspan=9 | Legend:

References

Phetmuangchon Por.Suantong
Living people
1993 births
Phetmuangchon Por.Suantong